The Bentley Hunaudières is a concept car built by Bentley for the 1999 Geneva Salon International de l'Auto. It is capable of a  top speed.

Name

Production
The concept, along with the similar Audi Rosemeyer, led to the production of the Bugatti Veyron by parent company Volkswagen.

Video game
The Bentley Hunaudières was featured in the 2000 video game TOCA World Touring Cars as an unlockable car.

References

Sports cars
Hunaudières
Rear mid-engine, rear-wheel-drive vehicles